is a passenger railway station located in the city of Kumagaya, Saitama, Japan, operated by the private railway operator Chichibu Railway.

Lines

The station was also served by the non-electrified 10.1 km single-track Tobu Kumagaya Line from Kumagaya to Menuma until it closed on 31 May 1983.

Station layout
The station is staffed and consists of a single island platform serving one bidirectional track. The platform is situated between the elevated Joetsu Shinkansen tracks and the JR Takasaki Line tracks, and the track of the former Tobu Kumagaya Line still remains alongside the now fenced-off rear face of the platform.

Adjacent stations

History
It was renamed Kami-Kumagaya from 1 July 1933.

The Tobu Kumagaya Line closed on 31 May 1983.

Passenger statistics
In fiscal 2018, the station was used by an average of 898 passengers daily.

Surrounding area
 Aeon Shopping Centre
 Yagihashi Department Store
 Yūkokuji Temple

See also
 List of railway stations in Japan

References

External links

 Kami-Kumagaya Station timetable 
 Kami-Kumagaya Station information (Saitama Prefectural Government) 

Railway stations in Saitama Prefecture
Railway stations in Japan opened in 1933
Railway stations in Kumagaya
Stations of Tobu Railway